Rubik's Clock is a mechanical puzzle invented and patented by Christopher C. Wiggs and Christopher J. Taylor. The Hungarian sculptor and professor of architecture Ernő Rubik bought the patent from them to market the product under his name.  It was first marketed in 1988.

Rubik's Clock is a two-sided puzzle, each side presenting nine clocks to the puzzler. There are four wheels, one at each corner of the puzzle, each allowing the corresponding corner clock to be rotated directly.  (The corner clocks, unlike the other clocks, rotate on both sides of the puzzle simultaneously and can never be operated independently.  Thus the puzzle contains only 14 independent clocks.)

There are also four buttons which span both sides of the puzzle; each button arranged such that if it is "in" on one side it is "out" on the other. The state of each button (in or out) determines whether the adjacent corner clock is mechanically connected to the three other adjacent clocks on the front side or on the back side: thus the configuration of the buttons determines which sets of clocks can be turned simultaneously by rotating a suitable wheel.

The aim of the puzzle is to set all nine clocks to 12 o'clock (straight up) on both sides of the puzzle simultaneously. The method to do so is to start by constructing a cross on both sides (at 12 o’clock) and then solving the corner clocks.

The Rubik’s clock is listed as one of the 17 WCA events, with records for fastest time to solve one puzzle, and the fastest average time to solve 5 puzzles (discarding the slowest and fastest times).

Combinations
Since there are 14 independent clocks, with 12 settings each, there are a total of =1,283,918,464,548,864 possible combinations for the clock faces. This does not count for the number of pin positions.

Records
The world record for a single solve is 2.87 seconds, set by Yunhao Lou (娄云皓) of China on May 1 2021 at Guangdong Open 2021 in Guangdong, China.

The world record average of 5 (excluding fastest and slowest) is 3.56 seconds, set by Jacob Chambers of the United Kingdom on 29 July 2022 at the Droitwich Spa Autumn 2022 in Droitwich Spa, Worcestershire with the times of 3.39, (4.21), 3.46, 3.83, and (3.16) seconds.

References

External links
 Rubik's Clock Solution An illustrated description of the solution.
 Unofficial Records Speedsolving.com's page of unofficial records for many puzzles including Rubik's Clock
 Real Genius Computer game implementation of Rubik's Clock for the Commodore Amiga, released in 1989
 https://www.worldcubeassociation.org/results/rankings/clock/average
 https://www.worldcubeassociation.org/results/rankings/clock/single?show=100+persons

Mechanical puzzles
Combination puzzles
1988 works
1988 introductions
1980s toys